Xiao Jia, personal name Zi Gao,  was a Shang dynasty King of China.

In the Records of the Grand Historian he was listed by Sima Qian as the seventh Shang king, succeeding his brother Tai Geng. He was enthroned in the year of Dingsi with Bo as his capital. He ruled for 17 years, was given the posthumous name Xiao Jia and was succeeded by brother Yong Ji.

Inscriptions on bones unearthed at Yinxu alternatively record that he was the sixth Shang king succeeding his brother Da Geng, given the posthumous name Xiao Jia and succeeded by his nephew Da Wu.

References

Shang dynasty kings